Egli Kaja (born 26 July 1997) is an Albanian professional footballer who plays as a winger for Altrincham. Kaja also represents Albania and received his first international call-up in May 2017.

Club career
Kaja's career began in 2003 with youth side MHD, where he was offered the opportunity to join Middlesbrough. Having finished as top scorer for three consecutive seasons, Kaja joined Kingstonian in 2006 upon moving to London. Once again finishing as top scorer in the youth set-up, he turned down a trial with Chelsea in order to join AFC Wimbledon. Enjoying a brief stint with AC Milan on trial, he later featured for the Dons on a scholarship, and turned down a second chance to compete for a contract in Milan the following season.

Kaja signed a professional contract with AFC Wimbledon in April 2015, and made his first team debut on Saturday 26 September. Coming off the bench in a 2–0 defeat to Luton Town, he also made a substitute appearance three days later in a 1–1 draw with Northampton Town. He scored his first goal for Wimbledon in an EFL Trophy tie against Barnet on 29 August 2017.

On 16 December 2016 Kaja was sent on loan to Lewes in the 2016–17 Isthmian League for one month. He made his debut on 31 December 2016 against Three Bridges in a 4–2 win. He scored his first and only goal for Lewes on 10 January 2017 against Herne Bay in a 2–4 away win.

In July 2018, Kaja joined newly-promoted Scottish Premiership side Livingston on a season-long loan but was recalled by new Wimbledon manager Wally Downes in December.

On 2 September 2019, Kaja joined Northampton on a free transfer until January 2020.

On 26 November 2021, Kaja returned to AFC Wimbledon on a short-term deal.

On 5 August 2022, following his release from AFC Wimbledon, Kaja joined Hampton & Richmond Borough after impressing during pre-season.

Just a few days after joining Hampton & Richmond Borough, Kaja left to join Altrincham.

International career
Kaja received his first international call up at the Albania national under-21 football team by coach Alban Bushi for a gathering between 14–17 May 2017 with most of the players selected from Albanian championships.

Style of play
Kaja is able to "play on either wing, or be deployed as a second striker". Upon signing for Livingston on loan, player-manager Kenny Miller described him as "quick, powerful and direct" adding that he "will bring a different dimension to our offensive options".

Career statistics

Club

References

External links

Egli Kaja - Player Profile Eurosport

1997 births
Living people
People from Ferizaj
Kosovo Albanians
Albanian footballers
Albania youth international footballers
Kosovan footballers
Association football midfielders
AFC Wimbledon players
Lewes F.C. players
Livingston F.C. players
Northampton Town F.C. players
Hampton & Richmond Borough F.C. players
English Football League players
Scottish Professional Football League players
Albanian expatriate sportspeople in England
Albanian expatriate footballers
Kosovan expatriate sportspeople in England
Kosovan expatriate footballers
Expatriate footballers in England
Expatriate footballers in Scotland